Mojo Nixon and Skid Roper is the debut album of Mojo Nixon and Skid Roper, released in 1985.

Production
The released album had served as the duo's demo tape.

Critical reception
Trouser Press called the album "a bit on the tame side — songs with titles like 'Jesus at McDonalds' and 'Art Fag Shuffle' should be great, but are merely clever."

Track listing 
All tracks composed by Mojo Nixon; except where indicated
 "Jesus at McDonalds"
 "Mushroom Maniac"
 "Moanin' With Your Mama"
 "Promised Land Tonight"
 "Guns To My Head"
 "I'm in Love with Your Girlfriend"
 "Rockin' Religion"
 "Big Payback" (Bruce Springsteen)
 "Comin' Down"
 "Mama Possums"
 "King of the Couch"
 "Art Fag Shuffle"
 "Black Yo' Eye"
 "Ain't Got Nobody" [cassette only]
 "Death Row Blues" [cassette only]

Personnel
Skid Roper - upright washboard and other stuff
Mojo Nixon - vocals, guitar and foot percussion
Technical
Recorded at The Bungalow, Coronado, Calif., except "Rockin' Religion" and "Black Yo' Eye", recorded at Soundtrax, S.D. Calif.
Produced by Ron Goudie
Mixed at Hit Single Below a Shopping Center
Photography by Jeff de Rose
Design by Skidmore Grafix

References 

1985 debut albums
Mojo Nixon albums
Skid Roper albums
I.R.S. Records albums